Herbert Smith (July 12, 1906 - death date unknown) was an American baseball pitcher in the Negro leagues. He played with the Baltimore Black Sox  in 1929 and 1932 and the Philadelphia Stars in 1933.

References

External links
 and Baseball-Reference Black Baseball stats and Seamheads

Baltimore Black Sox players
Philadelphia Stars players
1906 births
Year of death missing
Baseball pitchers